Pape Seydou Diop (born 12 January 1979) is a Senegalese retired international footballer.

Seydou Diop has played for Lens, Valenciennes, Norwich, RCF Paris, Aarau, Dinamo București, Levallois and Arras Football.

He made three appearances and scored one goal for the Senegal national team in the year 2000.

Honours
Dinamo București
Romanian Cup: 2002–03

References

External links
 

1979 births
Footballers from Dakar
Living people
Association football midfielders
Senegalese footballers
Senegal international footballers
Senegalese expatriate footballers
Expatriate footballers in Switzerland
Expatriate footballers in France
Expatriate footballers in Romania
Expatriate footballers in England
Senegalese expatriate sportspeople in England
Senegalese expatriate sportspeople in Romania
Norwich City F.C. players
FC Dinamo București players
FC Aarau players
RC Lens players
Valenciennes FC players
Racing Club de France Football players
Ligue 1 players
Liga I players